Norberto Bernárdez Ávila (born April 20, 1987) is a Honduran single sculls rower. Bernardez represented Honduras at the 2008 Summer Olympics in Beijing, where he competed as the nation's lone rower in the men's single sculls, an event which was later dominated by defending Olympic champion Olaf Tufte of Norway. Bernardez placed second and thirty-first overall in the F-final by forty seconds behind Kenya's Matthew Lidaywa Mwange, with a time of 8:32.22.

References

External links

NBC 2008 Olympics profile

1987 births
Living people
Honduran male rowers
Olympic rowers of Honduras
Rowers at the 2008 Summer Olympics